John Downs may refer to:
John M. Downs (died 2019), American sketch artist
John G. Downs (1873–1956), American farmer and politician from New York
Johnny Downs (1913–1994), American child actor
Dickie Downs (John Thomas Downs, 1886–1949), footballer

See also
John Downes (disambiguation)